Pacific Palisades is a 1990 French-American comedy film directed by Bernard Schmitt and starring Sophie Marceau in her American film debut, Adam Coleman Howard, and Anne E. Curry. The movie was filmed in Los Angeles, California.

Plot
A woman from Paris, Bernadette, comes to the United States after being promised a job. When she arrives, however, she learns that she is the victim of a hoax. Unable to return to France, Bernadette looks for work while staying with her close friend Shirley (Anne Curry), an actress looking for her big break. Their friendship is challenged when Bernadette finds herself falling in love with Shirley's boyfriend.

Cast
 Sophie Marceau as Bernardette
 Adam Coleman Howard as Ben
 Anne E. Curry as Liza
 Toni Basil as Désirée
 Virginia Capers as Shirley
 Diana Barton as Jill
 Sydney Lassick as Mr. Beer
 André Weinfeld as The Frenchie
 Caroline Grimm as Marion
 Maaike Jansen as Maman
 Farida Khelfa as Julie
 Isabelle Mergault as Sandrine
 Valérie Moureaux as Mimi
 Gérard Surugue as Rémi
 Bernard Verley

References

External links
 

1990 films
1990 comedy films
1990s English-language films
French comedy films
Films set in the United States
American comedy films
English-language French films
1990s American films
1990s French films